Æthelnoth or its variations Aethelnoth and Ethelnoth may refer to:

 Æthelnoth (bishop of London) (died between 816 and 824)
 Æthelnoth (archbishop of Canterbury) (died 1038), medieval prelate considered a saint

Old English given names
Masculine given names